Smith Township is one of the fourteen townships of Mahoning County, Ohio, United States. The 2010 census found 4,510 people in the township.

Geography
Located in the southwestern corner of the county, it borders the following townships:
Deerfield Township, Portage County - north
Berlin Township - northeast
Goshen Township - east
Butler Township, Columbiana County - southeast corner
Knox Township, Columbiana County - south
Lexington Township, Stark County - west

The farthest west township in Mahoning County, it is the only township to border Stark County.

Several populated places are located in Smith Township:
The city of Alliance, in the southwest corner
The village of Beloit, in the southeast
The village of Sebring, in the south
The census-designated places of East Alliance and Maple Ridge, in the southwest
The unincorporated community of North Benton, in the north

Name and history
Statewide, the only other Smith Township is located in Belmont County.

Smith Township was organized in March, 1821 upon the petition of Judge William Smith, in whose honor it was named. Judge William Smith was a pioneer in Mahoning County.

For many years, the township was part of Columbiana County, before becoming part of Mahoning County in 1846.

Government
The township is governed by a three-member board of trustees, who are elected in November of odd-numbered years to a four-year term beginning on the following January 1. Two are elected in the year after the presidential election and one is elected in the year before it. There is also an elected township fiscal officer, who serves a four-year term beginning on April 1 of the year after the election, which is held in November of the year before the presidential election. Vacancies in the fiscal officership or on the board of trustees are filled by the remaining trustees.

References

External links
County website

Townships in Mahoning County, Ohio
Townships in Ohio
1821 establishments in Ohio
Populated places established in 1821